Ar'jany Martha (born 4 September 2003) is a Dutch professional footballer who plays as a forward for Jong Ajax.

Club career
Martha, whose roots lie in Curaçao, joined Spartaan '20 in the south of his native city of Rotterdam during his childhood. He later moved to the football academy of the professional club Sparta Rotterdam, where he played for four years. Then Martha moved to the Ajax academy. Since the 2020–21 season he has been playing for the second team Jong Ajax in the second-tier Eerste Divisie.

International career
Martha is a youth international for the Netherlands.

Career statistics

Club

Notes

References

External links

2003 births
Living people
Dutch footballers
Netherlands youth international footballers
Dutch people of Curaçao descent
Association football forwards
Sparta Rotterdam players
AFC Ajax players
Jong Ajax players
Eerste Divisie players
Footballers from Rotterdam